Araiochelys ("narrow turtle") is an extinct genus of bothremydid pleurodiran turtle that was discovered in the Ouled Abdoun Basin, Morocco. The genus consists solely of type species A. hirayamai.

Discovery 
Araiochelys was discovered in the Ouled Abdoun Basin of Morocco, primarily known for its Maastrichtian and Paleocene fossils.

Description 
The preorbital section of Araiochelys'''s skull is narrower than in all other members of the Bothremydini. The dorsal process is noted by the describers as being narrow in contrast to Bothremys. The ridge forming the lower rim of the orbit is relatively distinct, also in contrast to Bothremys''.

References 

Bothremydidae 
Prehistoric turtle genera
Monotypic turtle genera
Paleocene turtles
Fossils of Morocco 
Paleocene life
Cretaceous Africa
Fossil taxa described in 2006